Guanyinge is a town in Xupu County in western Hunan province, China, located about  northeast of the county seat. , it has two residential communities and 22 villages under its administration.

References

External links 

Towns of Huaihua
Xupu